Ruapuke Island is one of the southernmost islands in New Zealand's main chain of islands. It was named "Bench Island" upon its discovery by Captain James Cook in 1770, but has rarely been known by any other name than its Māori name, which means "two hills". Ruapuke Island was called Goulburn Island by Captain John Kent, named after Frederick Goulburn, a Government official in New South Wales, but the whalers generally called it Long Island, or Robuck. It guards the eastern end of Foveaux Strait.

History
The island formerly had a Māori population of 200. Notable Māori inhabitants included Kāi Tahu chief Tūhawaiki and John Topi Patuki, MLC. A mission station was established on the island in 1843 by the Rev Johan Wohlers, but it too is long gone.

The island was the site of several shipwrecks during the latter half of the 19th century, though most were without the loss of life. One exception was the collision of the cutters "Annie" and "Deveron" during a storm in April 1894, which resulted in the loss of two lives. The island and its surrounding rocks and reefs are still a hazard to the fishing vessels which ply Foveaux Strait, itself a notoriously dangerous stretch of water.

Sheep were farmed on the island for some time, though it is now uninhabited, and privately owned by descendants of Tūhawaiki. The island is notable for its bird life, and it is a breeding site for the endangered yellow-eyed penguin. Cetaceans such as southern right whales may be spotted around the island during migration seasons.

Geography
The island is covered mainly with stunted trees, but also has open scrub land and some low-lying marshland. The island's major geographic features include three large bays, the largest of which is Henrietta Bay, in the southwest, named for the brig Elizabeth Henrietta which ran aground there in February 1824. The other bays are Lagoon Bay (in the west) and Caroline Bay (in the north west). The small Waitokariro Lagoon lies immediately inland from Henrietta Bay. The three bays are separated by two large peninsulas, and two more peninsulas extend at the northern and southern ends of the island, culminating in North Head and South Head respectively. One of these peninsulas, that between Lagoon and Caroline Bays, is a tombolo. It is these two hummocks which give the island its name.

The eastern coast is dominated by two long, generally straight beaches to the north, and a series of smaller coves to the south. Between the longer beaches and smaller coves lies an inlet, the mouth of the only river system on the island. Other small islets and groups of islets can be found off the coast of Ruapuke. Between Green Island and South Head is a further small group, the Breaksea Islands. Numerous other smaller rocks and reefs surround the island.

Geology
Exposed basement igneous intrusion rocks are found on this rather flat island that are Longwood Suite granitoids in the Median Batholith that bisects Zealandia dividing its Western and Eastern Provinces. These plutonic rocks are part of a former subduction zone on the edge of Gondwana, before Zealandia's separation from it; about 260 to 245 million years ago in the case of the dated rocks from the island.

See also

 List of islands of New Zealand
 List of islands
 Desert island

References

 
Uninhabited islands of New Zealand
Islands of Southland, New Zealand
Foveaux Strait
Private islands of New Zealand